The National Unity Committee was a military committee formed following the 1960 Turkish coup d'état. It dissolved with the 1961 general election.

Background
Between 1950 and 1960, the ruling party in Turkey was Democrat Party (DP). Towards 1960, Turkey faced political corruption and economic crises, in which the Turkish currency was devalued from  2.80 to  9.00 for US$1.00. Rise in commodity prices and scarcity of imported industrial goods caused unrest, and consequently political support for the DP decreased while it increased for the opposition, especially  for the Republican People's Party (CHP). The  DP government tried to suppress a revival of the CHP banning public activities of the CHP. In 1959, İsmet İnönü, the leader of the CHP, was assaulted at rallies by DP sympathizers in Uşak on May 1 and in İstanbul on May 4. The press was set under heavy censorship. Many journalists, including popular columnist Metin Toker, as well as profiled opposition politicians, such as Osman Bölükbaşı, the leader of the Republican Villagers Nation Party (CKMP), were arrested. On April 27, 1960, the parliamentary group of the DP, which held the majority in the parliament, passed a law to form a Committee of Inquest, which was authorized with the powers of a court. The committee, composed of DP deputies only, was tasked with inquires about the members of the opposition parties and the press.

The committee

On May 27, 1960, a group of military officers staged a coup d'état. The revolting officers did not act in the traditional military hierarchy. The chief of general staff, commanders of the air and naval forces were not among the group, and the commander of the land forces General Cemal Gürsel joined the group only after the operation began. The number of generals in the group with 38 members was only five while the remaining officers were of lower ranks as colonel, major or even captain.
                     
Below is the list of the committee members:

The chairman of the committee was Cemal Gürsel. He became also the prime minister in the 24th and 25th government of Turkey during the military regime.

Among other generals, Irfan Baştuğ died in a traffic accident on September 12, 1960 and Cemal Madanoğlu resigned from the committee on July 7, 1961, both during the military regime.

The Fourteen
While Cemal Gürsel was trying to re-establish the civilian regime as soon as possible, fourteen members of the committee under the leadership of Colonel Alparslan Türkeş were planning to continue the military regime with the intention of making reforms. On September 13, 1960, they were expelled from the committee. (Their names are marked by yellow color in the above list.) They were sent as diplomats to Turkish embassies abroad. Although they were later given pardon, they could never return to the committee. In later years, Alparslan Türkeş became the leader of the Republican Villagers Nation Party and renamed it to Nationalist Movement Party.

Aftermath
Following the 1961 general election on October 15, Turkey returned to civilian regime. Cemal Gürsel was elected president. The other 21 members of the MBK became the permanent members of the Turkish senate. In 1968 five of them were expelled from the senate. The rest lost their memberships by another coup in 1980.

See also
1962 attempted coup in Turkey

References

1960 in Turkish politics
Turkish Land Forces
Military coups in Turkey
Military dictatorships
1960 establishments in Turkey
1961 disestablishments in Turkey